The British Academy Television Award for Best Comedy Entertainment Programme or Series was first presented at the 1981 ceremony. According to British Academy of Film and Television Arts the category "includes programmes that capture the idea of comedy being central to the editorial of the programme and includes panel-led shows, chat shows where comic content plays a big part, stand-up and comedy clip shows".

Since the 2000 BAFTA TV Award ceremony there has been a separate award category for Best Situation Comedy. This category had previously been presented from 1973-1980 (when there was no Best Comedy Series award). Throughout the 1980s and 1990s 'Situation Comedies' were included in the Best Comedy Programme or Series category.

Name variations for this category:
1981–1992: Best Comedy Series
1992–2007: Best Comedy Programme or Series
2007–2013: Best Comedy Programme
2014–present: Best Comedy and Comedy Entertainment Programme

Winners and nominees

1960s
Best Comedy Series

1980s
Best Comedy Series

1990s
Best Comedy Series

Best Comedy Programme or Series
{| class="wikitable" width="95%" border="1" cellpadding="5" cellspacing="0"
|-
! width=5% | Year
! width=25% | Title
! width=25% | Recipient(s)
! width=10% | Broadcaster
|-
| rowspan="4" style="text-align:center;"|1992 || style="background:#B0C4DE;"|One Foot in the Grave || style="background:#B0C4DE;"|Susan Belbin, David Renwick || style="background:#B0C4DE;"| BBC One
|-
| The Curse of Mr. Bean || Richard Curtis, Robin Driscoll, Rowan Atkinson, John Howard Davies || ITV
|-
| Drop the Dead Donkey || Guy Jenkin, Andy Harnilton, Liddy Oldroyd || Channel 4
|-
| Only Fools and Horses || Tony Dow, Gareth Gwenlan, John Sullivan || BBC One
|-
| rowspan="4" style="text-align:center;"|1993 || style="background:#B0C4DE;"|Absolutely Fabulous || style="background:#B0C4DE;"|Jon Plowman, Jennifer Saunders, Bob Spiers || style="background:#B0C4DE;"| BBC Two
|-
| One Foot in the Grave || Susan Belbin, David Renwick || rowspan="3"| BBC One
|-
| Birds of a Feather || Terry Kinane, Laurence Marks, Maurice Gran, Candida Julian-Jones 
|-
| Waiting for God || Gareth Gwenlan, Michael Aitkens
|-
| rowspan="4" style="text-align:center;"|1994 || style="background:#B0C4DE;"|Drop the Dead Donkey || style="background:#B0C4DE;"|Andy Hamilton, Guy Jenkin, Liddy Oldroyd || style="background:#B0C4DE;"| Channel 4
|-
| Rab C. Nesbitt || Colin Gilbert, Ian Pattison || BBC Two
|-
| Chef! || Charlie Hanson, John Birkin, Peter Tilbury || BBC One
|-
| Desmond's || Humphrey Barclay, Paulette Randall, Jan Sargent || Channel 4
|-
| rowspan="4" style="text-align:center;"|1995 || style="background:#B0C4DE;"|Three Fights, Two Weddings and a Funeral || style="background:#B0C4DE;"|Geoff Posner, David Tyler || style="background:#B0C4DE;"| BBC Two
|-
| Absolutely Fabulous || Jon Plowman, Bob Spiers, Jennifer Saunders || rowspan="2"| BBC One
|-
| One Foot in the Grave || Susan Belbin, David Renwick 
|-
| Drop the Dead Donkey || Andy Hamilton, Guy Jenkin, Liddy Oldroyd || Channel 4
|-
| rowspan="4" style="text-align:center;"|1996 || style="background:#B0C4DE;"|Father Ted || style="background:#B0C4DE;"|Graham Linehan, Declan Lowney, Arthur Matthews, Geoffrey Perkins || style="background:#B0C4DE;"| Channel 4|-
| One Foot in the Grave || Susan Belbin, David Renwick || rowspan="3"| BBC One
|-
| Absolutely Fabulous || Jon Plowman, Bob Spiers, Jennifer Saunders
|-
| Men Behaving Badly || Beryl Vertue, Martin Dennis, Simon Nye
|-
| rowspan="4" style="text-align:center;"|1997 || style="background:#B0C4DE;"|Only Fools and Horses || style="background:#B0C4DE;"|Tony Dow, Gareth Gwenlan & John Sullivan || style="background:#B0C4DE;"| BBC One|-
| Father Ted || Lissa Evans, Graham Linehan, Declan Lowney, Arthur Matthews || Channel 4
|-
| Absolutely Fabulous || Jon Plowman, Janice Thomas, Bob Spiers, Jennifer Saunders || BBC One
|-
| Game On || Geoffrey Perkins, Sioned Wiliam, John Stroud, Andrew Davies, Bernadette Davis || BBC Two
|-
| rowspan="4" style="text-align:center;"|1998 || style="background:#B0C4DE;"|I'm Alan Partridge || style="background:#B0C4DE;"|Peter Baynham, Dominic Brigstocke, Steve Coogan, Armando Iannucci || style="background:#B0C4DE;"| BBC Two|-
| One Foot in the Grave || Esta Charkham, Christine Gernon, David Renwick || rowspan="3"| BBC One
|-
| The Vicar of Dibley || Jon Plowman, Sue Vertue, Dewi Humphreys, Richard Curtis, Paul Mayhew-Archer
|-
| Men Behaving Badly || Beryl Vertue, Martin Dennis, Simon Nye
|-
| rowspan="4" style="text-align:center;"|1999 || style="background:#B0C4DE;"|Father Ted || style="background:#B0C4DE;"|Andy DeEmmony, Lissa Evans, Graham Linehan, Arthur Matthews || style="background:#B0C4DE;"| Channel 4|-
| The Vicar of Dibley || Jon Plowman, Sue Vertue, Dewi Humphreys, Richard Curtis, Paul Mayhew-Archer || rowspan="2"| BBC One
|-
| Dinnerladies || Geoff Posner, Victoria Wood
|-
| The Royle Family || Glenn Wilhide, Mark Mylod, Caroline Aherne, Craig Cash, Henry Normal || BBC Two
|-
|}

2000sBest Comedy Programme or Series2010sBest Comedy Programme or SeriesBest Comedy Entertainment Programme2020sNote''': In BAFTA production categories, entrants are asked to submit no more than four names to be listed as nominees should the programme be nominated. If it is not possible to decide on four names the nomination credit is listed as "production team", in these cases no individual can refer to themselves as BAFTA winning. It will be the programme that is BAFTA winning, not any individual.

References

Comedy